Saathiya - Pyaar Ka Nayaa Ehsaas is an Indian television drama series that aired on Sahara One in 2004. The story portrays the lives of three friends: Kshitij, Aryan, and Gayatri.

Cast 
 Amar Upadhyay as Kshitij Singhania
 Sanjeet Bedi as Aryan Oberoi
 Shraddha Nigam as Gayatri
 Iqlaq Khan as Vimal Singhania
 Shishir Sharma as  Anish Oberoi
 Manini Mishra as Avanti Anish Oberoi
 Saurabh Dubey as Om Prakash Singh
 Vineeta Malik as Dadi
 Vishal Sablani
 Nandita Puri
 Mandeep Bhandar

References

Sahara One original programming
Indian drama television series
2004 Indian television series debuts
2005 Indian television series endings